Brahman (stylized as BRAHMAN) is a Japanese punk band formed in Tokyo in 1995. They are known for mixing hardcore with folk music.

History
Brahman formed in 1995, when the band that Toshi-Low and Daisuke were in and the band that Ronzi and Makoto were in both disbanded, and the four musicians hit it off about the musical direction they wanted to go in. Their name comes from the Sanskrit word Brahman meaning "absolute reality", and represents their ethos of bringing Asian influences to the Western punk genre, including Okinawan, folk and gypsy music. After the 1996 release of the mini-album Grope Our Way, Daisuke left the band. The mini-album Wait and Wait was released in 1997, after which, guitarist Kohki joined. Their first studio album, 1998's A Man of the World, sold over 600,000 copies.

In 2001, Brahman released the album A Forlorn Hope, which sold over 500,000 copies. It was later released in America by Revelation Records in 2005.

Members
Current members
 Toshi-Low – vocals (1995–present)
 Makoto – bass (1995–present)
 Ronzi – drums (1995–present)
 Kohki – guitar (1997–present)

Former members
 Nabe – bass (1995)
 Daisuke – guitar (1995–1996)

Discography

Studio albums
A Man of the World (1998) Oricon Albums Chart peak: 99
A Forlorn Hope (2001) 2
The Middle Way (2004) 3
Antinomy (2008) 4
Eternal Recurrence (2009) 7
 4
 3

Mini-albums
Grope Our Way (1996)
Wait and Wait (1997)

Singles

References

External links
 Official website
 Metropolis Magazine article

Japanese hardcore punk groups
Japanese alternative rock groups
Toy's Factory artists
Musical groups from Tokyo